Jennifer Esposito is an American actress. She is known for her roles in the feature films  Summer of Sam (1999), Don't Say a Word (2001), Welcome to Collinwood (2002), Crash (2004), Taxi (2004), and Mob Town (2019). She has also appeared in several television series, most notably The Looney Tunes Show, Spin City, Related, Samantha Who?, Blue Bloods, and Mistresses. From 2016 to 2017, she played Special Agent Alexandra Quinn on the CBS series NCIS. She also played CIA Deputy Director Susan Raynor in the Amazon series The Boys.

Early life
Esposito was born in New York City, the second of two daughters of Phyllis, an interior decorator, and Robert Esposito, a music producer. She is of Italian descent, and was raised on Staten Island in Bulls Head and is a graduate of Moore Catholic High School.

Career

Esposito made her first television appearance in Law & Order in 1996. She then joined the cast of Spin City, where she appeared for two seasons. She also appeared in I Still Know What You Did Last Summer. One of her more notable roles was as "Ruby" in Spike Lee's Summer of Sam in 1999, which was set against the late 1970s backdrop of the Son of Sam murders. Esposito's next films included Dracula 2000, The Master of Disguise, the 2004 comedy Taxi, and the Academy Award-winning film Crash, in which she played Don Cheadle's partner and romantic interest, Ria.

Esposito joined Jon Favreau, Stephen Dorff, Luis Guzmán, and Barry Pepper for Dinner for Five season 3, episode 7, on May 21, 2004. Esposito has made television appearances on the series Law & Order: SVU, Rescue Me, and Mercy. She was a regular cast member on Related and Samantha Who?. Esposito joined the cast of the CBS drama Blue Bloods in 2010, playing the role of Detective Jackie Curatola, the partner of Detective Danny Reagan (played by Donnie Wahlberg). In the third season Esposito was diagnosed with celiac disease and, after collapsing on set, Esposito informed CBS that her condition would limit her availability to work on the series. Rather than work around her limited schedule, Blue Bloods producers chose to write her character out of the series in 2012.

In 2013 she launched Jennifer's Way Bakery in Manhattan's West Village, which only serves celiac-safe food. In 2014 she joined the NBC series Taxi Brooklyn. On April 22, 2014, Da Capo Lifelong Books published Esposito's first book Jennifer's Way, a detailed look into her personal struggle with celiac disease before and after she was diagnosed and the things she did to survive. The book made The New York Times Best Seller List on July 6, 2014. In 2015 Esposito played Calista Raines in the ABC drama series Mistresses, and it was reported that she would be a cast member on the CBS pilot Taxi-22, whose main character would be played by John Leguizamo. She played Dominic West's sister in the Showtime series The Affair for six episodes.

Esposito became the brand ambassador for Eclair Naturals also in 2015, a gluten- and GMO-free vegan body and skin care line available in Rite Aid stores across the United States. In 2016 it was announced that Esposito would join the cast of NCIS as Special Agent Alexandra "Alex" Quinn, an experienced agent who left field work and became an instructor at the Law Enforcement Training Center. NCIS leader, Leroy Jethro Gibbs (Mark Harmon), will lure Quinn back into the field as part of his team where he will take advantage of her sharp wit, quick mind and immense talent as a federal agent. Upon her joining the cast of NCIS, executive producer Gary Glasberg said, "We couldn't be happier to have Jennifer Esposito joining us for season 14. She embodies everything that we hoped for in the character of Quinn and we can't wait to have her come be a part of our team". In June 2017, it was announced that this would be her only season. Esposito appeared on the September 10, 2016, episode of Oprah: Where Are They Now?, where she said her doctor had her hospitalized in a psych ward. She said the hospitalization happened during the time she was an actress on the show Samantha Who? 

In 2019, she joined the cast of The Boys, an Amazon Prime Exclusive. In August, she was set to play a recurring role in the Awkwafina series on Comedy Central.

In February 2020, Esposito joined the Netflix series Inventing Anna created by Shonda Rhimes.

Personal life
Esposito married actor Bradley Cooper on December 30, 2006. In May 2007, after five months of marriage, they filed for divorce, which was finalized that November. In 2009, Esposito became engaged to Australian tennis player Mark Philippoussis. The couple separated in August 2010. In October 2011, Esposito announced  on The Late Show with David Letterman that she had celiac disease. In May 2014, Esposito announced her engagement to British model Louis Dowler. They married on November 16, 2014, in New York City. It was reported in March 2016 that Esposito had filed for divorce from Dowler. In 2020, Esposito married Jesper Vesterstrøm.

Filmography

Film

Television

Web

References

External links

 

20th-century American actresses
21st-century American actresses
21st-century American women writers
Actresses from New York City
21st-century American businesspeople
21st-century American businesswomen
American film actresses
21st-century American memoirists
American writers of Italian descent
American television actresses
Lee Strasberg Theatre and Film Institute alumni
Living people
Outstanding Performance by a Cast in a Motion Picture Screen Actors Guild Award winners
People from Staten Island
American women memoirists
Writers from Brooklyn
Year of birth missing (living people)